Joseph Osmond Barnard (10 August 1816 – 30 May 1865) was born in Portsmouth, England. He was a miniature painter and engraver who engraved the rare Mauritius "Post Office" stamps.  He died in Mauritius on 30 May 1865.

References
 Harold Adolphe and Raymond d'Unienville, "The Life and Death of Joseph Osmond Barnard", The London Philatelist, Vol. 83, No. 985 (Dec., 1974), pp. 263–5.
ENCYCLOPÆDIA Mauritiana
Barnard biography

1816 births
1865 deaths
English engravers
Artists from Portsmouth